Chammak Chandra is an Indian comedian and actor, known for the Jabardast comedy show. Chandra was born in Venkatapur  in Nizamabad, Telangana. He made his film debut in the Teja movie Jai. Later he performed skits with actor Dhanraj and Venu and earned the attention of producer Mallemala. He found an opportunity in performing in the Jabardast comedy show. He entered Kollywood by appearing in the Tamil film Seyal.

Controversy
Actress Swathi Naidu criticized Chandra in a video stating that he was exploiting girls for sexual favors by telling them he would offer them a chance in the show.  Jabardasth He later refuted this claiming that the prima donna was trying to slander him.

Filmography

Television

References

External links

21st-century Indian male actors
Indian male comedians
Year of birth missing (living people)
Living people